Betty Manygoats (born 1945) is a Navajo artist known for her ceramic work. She lives and works at Cow Springs on the Navajo Nation in Arizona in the American Southwest.

Biography
Manygoats was born at Shoto/Cow Springs, on the Navajo Nation. She was born into the Tàchiiʼnii clan. She and her husband William Manygoats, whom she married in 1963, have ten children. Many of her grown children are also potters. She is also known as Betty Barlow.

Art work
Manygoats learned the art of silversmithing, weaving and beadwork when she was growing up. When she was in her twenties, she learned to make traditional functional pottery from her grandmother, Grace Barlow. As her work progressed, she developed a style that exaggerated the surface decoration, motifs, and shapes of traditional Navajo pottery. In the 1970s, Manygoats developed a style of working that incorporated the application of hand-built clay horned toads which became her trademark.

Collections
Manygoats' work is included in the collection of the Renwick Gallery of the Smithsonian American Art Museum. She is also represented in the collections of the National Museum of the American Indian. and the William C. and Evelyn M. Davies Gallery of Southwest Indian Art at the Museum of Texas Tech University.

References

Native American potters
1945 births
American ceramists
American women ceramists
Living people
American potters
20th-century ceramists
21st-century ceramists
20th-century American women artists
20th-century American artists
21st-century American women artists
21st-century American artists
Native American women artists
Navajo artists
20th-century Native Americans
21st-century Native Americans
20th-century Native American women
21st-century Native American women